The 1924 United States presidential election in Connecticut took place on November 4, 1924, as part of the 1924 United States presidential election which was held throughout all contemporary 48 states. Voters chose seven representatives, or electors to the Electoral College, who voted for president and vice president. 

Connecticut voted for the Republican nominee, incumbent President Calvin Coolidge of Massachusetts, over the Democratic nominee, Ambassador John W. Davis of West Virginia. Coolidge ran with former Budget Director Charles G. Dawes of Illinois, while Davis ran with Governor Charles W. Bryan of Nebraska. Also in the running that year was the Progressive Party nominee, Senator Robert M. La Follette of Wisconsin and his running mate Senator Burton K. Wheeler of Montana. La Follette’s support base was primarily among rural German and Scandinavian Americans, and he possessed little appeal in the Northeast outside a few New York and Boston anti-Prohibition precincts.

Coolidge won Connecticut by a margin of 34.01%. His victory was also enjoyed a unique personal popularity which helped him in the state and the rest of New England. He was the epitome of a traditional New England Yankee, having been born in the small-town of Plymouth Notch, Vermont, and establishing his political career nearby as Governor of Massachusetts. Thus Coolidge remained especially popular with voters across the New England region.

The 1920s were a fiercely Republican decade in American politics, and Connecticut in that era was a fiercely Republican state in presidential elections. The economic boom and social good feelings of the Roaring Twenties under popular Republican leadership virtually guaranteed Calvin Coolidge an easy win in the state against the conservative Southern Democrat John Davis, who had little appeal in Northern states like Connecticut. 

As of 2020, this was the last presidential election in which the Republican nominee carried the city of Hartford. This is the most recent election, as of 2022, where Connecticut voted to the right of New Hampshire.

Results

By county

Results by town

See also
 United States presidential elections in Connecticut

Notes

References

Connecticut
1924
1924 Connecticut elections